The Kill Hole is a 2012 American action thriller war film written and directed by Mischa S. Webley and starring Chadwick Boseman, Tory Kittles, Dennis Adkins, Victoria Blake, Ted Rooney with Peter Greene and Billy Zane.  It is Webley's directorial debut.

Plot
The shadow of war follows a troubled Iraq War vet as he is forced to pursue one of his own into the Pacific Northwest wilderness to finally confront a war crime that has haunted them both. Lt. Samuel Drake is a troubled vet plagued by his actions while deployed in Iraq. Recently discharged, he is trying to piece his life back together while he works as a cab driver and lives in a rundown motel room. He also attends counseling sessions led by Marshall to help cope with the horrors of his past. While on this path to a fresh start, Drake's fragile new life is shattered when two executives, who represent a private military contractor, present a new mission, one with no option to refuse; track down and kill Sgt. Devin Carter, an AWOL Marine Corps. sniper who knows the truth about Drake's past and who himself is on a mission to target and kill members of the mercenary firm. A gripping, lyrical meditation on war and the scars it leaves on those who fight, The Kill Hole is a story of one man who is forced to face his violent past, and the uneasy bond he forms with the mysterious assassin he must confront in his quest for redemption.

Cast

 Chadwick Boseman as Lt. Samuel Drake
 Tory Kittles as Sgt. Devon Carter
 Dennis Adkins as Hull
 Victoria Blake as Carol
 Ted Rooney as James
 Peter Greene as Peter Krebbs
 Billy Zane as Marshall

Reception
The film has a 25% rating on Rotten Tomatoes.

References

External links
 
 

American action thriller films
American war films
2012 directorial debut films
2012 films
2010s English-language films
2010s American films